The Petition of Free Negroes was a document created by a group of freed slaves who had fought for the British in the American Revolutionary War, and been rewarded with land grants in Upper Canada for their service to the Crown. Because the grants were spread around the province, isolating the freed men among the otherwise-white settlers, on June 29, 1794, nineteen men from the Niagara region submitted a petition to Lieutenant Governor John Graves Simcoe hoping to address this. Their petition read:

Listed as having signed the petition were Jack Baker, Jack Becker, John Cesar, John Dimon, Tom Frey, John Gerof, Peter Green, Michael Grote, John Jackson, Adam Lewis, Peter Ling, Richard Pierpoint, Pompadour, John Smith, Saison Sepyed, Simon Speck, Robert Spranklin, Thomas Walker and Jack Wurmwood.

The petition was turned down by Simcoe for unknown reasons, although the recent abolition of slavery in the province had generated no small amount of hostility and his refusal may have been a way of avoiding revisiting the contentious act.

References

Sources

 
Black Loyalists
Underground Railroad people
1794 in Canada
History of Black people in Canada
18th century in Ontario